The 2007 Oregon State Beavers football team represented Oregon State University in the 2007 NCAA Division I FBS football season. The team's head coach was Mike Riley. Home games were played at Reser Stadium in Corvallis, Oregon.

Season notes
The team returned 16 starting players from the previous season and was predicted by some analysts to contend for second place in the Pac-10.  They returned a majority of the defense, which was ranked second in the nation for total sacks, eighth in the nation in tackles for loss, and within the top 20 in rushing defense in the 2006–07 season.  CFN picked the Beavers in their preseason top 25 and claimed they were a "heavy sleeper for big things" in the 2007 season.  The Beavers finished the season 9–4, good for third place in the Pac-10, and won the Emerald Bowl 21–14.  Their run defense finished second in the nation for fewest rushing yards allowed per game only behind Boston College.

Schedule

Roster
QB#1 Sean Canfield (SO)
QB#3 Lyle Moevao (SO)
QB#2 Ryan Gunderson (SR)
RB#6 Clinton Polk (SR)
RB#5 Patrick Fuller (JR)
WR#9 Anthony Brown (SR)
WR#16 James Rodgers (FR)
WR#12 Chris Johnson (JR)
WR#15 Sam Oltman (FR)
WR#17 Sammie Stroughter (SR)
TE#19 Brady Camp (FR)
LS#55 Joel Cohen (SR)
K#13 Alexis Serna (SR)
TE#85 John Reese (SO)

Game summaries

Utah

The Beavers opened the season hosting the Utah Utes of the Mountain West Conference on a Thursday night game, the first day of the college football season.  Beavers' star running back Yvenson Bernard ran for 165 yards and two touchdowns and quarterback Sean Canfield completed eight of 19 passes for 87 yards and a touchdown.  Beaver Coach Mike Riley, still trying to determine a starting quarterback, also brought in quarterback Lyle Moevao to start the second quarter, though his first pass was intercepted.  Alexis Serna made a 37-yard field goal in the 3rd quarter.

Cincinnati

Idaho State

Arizona State

UCLA

Arizona

California

Stanford

Southern California

Washington

Washington State

On a cold, rainy night in Pullman, Washington, the Beavers forced 8 turnovers en route to a 52-17 victory against the Cougars. Yvenson Bernard ran for 2 touchdowns and 77 yards as Lyle Moevao played mistake free in his second career start. Alex Brink threw 5 first half interceptions as the stingy Beaver defense put pressure on him all game long.

Oregon
Beavers own the State again. James Rodgers scores on a fly sweep in double OT. OSU's stingy D stuffs Jonathan Stewart on 4th down, to clinch the first victory on enemy soil for either team since 1996.

Emerald Bowl

References

External links

Oregon State
Oregon State Beavers football seasons
Redbox Bowl champion seasons
Oregon State Beavers football